Junctional epidermolysis bullosa may refer to:
 Junctional epidermolysis bullosa (medicine)
 Junctional epidermolysis bullosa (veterinary medicine)